The Knox Trophy is the oldest military award of the United States Military Academy at West Point. The award was established on October 8, 1910, and is given annually by the Sons of the Revolution in the State of New York to the United States Military Academy cadet with the highest rating for military efficiency. Named in honor of General Henry Knox, the first Secretary of War, the original trophy, made by Tiffany & Company was originally kept on display in the office of the West Point Commandant.

The Knox Trophy celebrated its 100th anniversary in 2010.

History 
Named in honor of Henry Knox, the first US Secretary of War, the original trophy, made by Tiffany & Company was originally kept on display in the office of the West Point Commandant. The tradition started back on October 8, 1910, and continues today as the academy's oldest military award. According to the Sons of the Revolution in New York (SRNY), the trophy was designed by Tiffany & Company and is still presented annually to the Corps of Cadets of the United States Military Academy by the Sons of the Revolution (NY).

The United States Military Academy is a school for the practical and theoretical training of cadets for the military service. Upon completing its course satisfactorily, cadets are eligible for promotion and commission as second lieutenants in any arm or corps of the Army the duties of which they have been judged competent to perform.

Sherman L. Fleek, Lt. Col. US Army (Ret) United States Military Academy Command Historian noted, “The cadets undergo months and months, years actually of leadership evaluations, testing, training, and so on, since the trophy winners seemed to be First Captains because the First Captain excelled in leadership.”

A record in 1909 found an order of general merit ranking that included an order of merit score in; Civil and Military Engineering, Law, Ordnance and Science of Gunnery, Drill Regulations, Practical Military Engineering, Conduct First Class, less demerits for the year, providing a General Merit Ranking (looking for confirmation that this is the same reference to "military efficiency rating").

In 1978, the Commandant requested the Knox Trophy be presented to the Brigade Executive Officer. There was no established award for that position at the time. But in 1979, the Knox Trophy was again awarded to the cadet with the highest military efficiency. An award was established in 1981 recognizing the Brigade Executive Officer.

Activities 
The Knox Trophy is awarded annually prior to commencement ceremonies each year at the USMA at West Point. The award is normally presented by the President or board member of the Sons of the Revolution of the State of New York. A photograph along the annual commencement publication is sent back to the SR Headquarters at the Fraunces Tavern and Museum in New York City. Since the early 1960s, each winner has received a keepsake Tiffany silver Revere bowl.  A keepsake replica, alongside a print of General Henry Knox is on display at Fraunces Tavern in lower Manhattan (see image at the top of the piece).

The Sons of the Revolution of the State of New York
According to the Sons of the Revolution in New York (SRNY), the trophy was designed by Tiffany & Company and is still presented annually to the Corps of Cadets of the United States Military Academy by the Sons of the Revolution (NY). The tradition started back on October 8, 1910, and continues today as the academy's oldest military award.

Sons of the Revolution (SR) should not be confused with Sons of the American Revolution (SAR), a separate group which was founded on April 30, 1889, at New York by New Jersey businessman William Osborn McDowell. He disagreed with the Sons of the Revolution requirement of the time that other state societies be subordinate to the New York society, and intended to include members by recognizing additional types of public service of a revolutionary ancestor beyond that which contributed directly to the Revolution.

Fraunces Tavern 

Fraunces Tavern is a museum and restaurant housed in a restored building that played a prominent role in pre-Revolution and Revolution history. The building that houses the tavern, located at 54 Pearl Street at the corner of Broad Street, has been owned by the New York society since 1904, which claims it is Manhattan's oldest surviving building.

The building served also as the offices of the General Society until 2002, when the society headquarters moved to its current location in Independence, Mo. The museum maintains several galleries of art and artifacts about the Revolution including the McEntee "Sons of the Revolution" Gallery that displays much of the SR history.

Other Sons of the Revolution Military Awards 
The General Society and several state societies have established various educational and military awards which are given to individuals and groups for their academic or service performance. The awards include the Annapolis Cup which was created in 1905 and given annually by the general society and the Maryland society to a U.S. Naval Academy midshipman, the Knox Trophy (New York) which was created in 1910 and given annually by the New York society to a U.S. Military Academy at West Point cadet, the Capt. Gustavus Conyngham Award which was created in 1999 and given annually by the New York society to a U.S. Merchant Marine Academy at Kings Point midshipman, the Recognition Award which was created in 2002 and given annually by the Massachusetts society to a U.S. Army ROTC cadet, and the Knox Trophy (From Massachusetts, not New York) which was created in 1924 and given annually until 1940 by the Massachusetts society to a U.S. Army field-artillery battery and "redleg" artillery operator.

Knox Trophy Recipients 
Most of the recipients were the First Captain of their graduating class, but it is not a requirement to win the award. On the list is some of the top U.S. Army officers; William Westmoreland, Pete Dawkins (1959 Heisman Trophy winner), and several others, including John P. McConnell who was later the US Air Force Chief of Staff. Four of the Knox trophy winners became four-star generals. As of 1987, three winners were stationed at West Point; the 1955 winner, Col. Lee D. Olvey, head of the Department of Social Sciences; the 1968 winner, LTC John L. Throckmorton, Jr., Treasurer of the USMA; 1969 winner, LTC Robert H. Baldwin, Jr., professor / Department of Social Sciences.
2010 – Nicholas Reisweber
2009 – Justin Wei Sen Lee (Singapore Armed Forces)
2008 – Jason Crabtree, First Captain USMA, Kingston, WA
2007 – Jonathan C. Nielsen, First Captain USMA
2006 – Peter J. Cacossa
2005 – James M. Edelen
2004 – Joseph Z. Wells
2003 – John R. Rhodes, Jr.
2002 – Andrew T. Blickhahn, First Captain USMA
2001 – Jonathan J. Hopkins
2000 – Scott Handler
1999 – Robert M. Shaw, First Captain USMA
1998 – Robert K. Bryant
1997 – Joseph M. Ewers
1996 – Scott M. Naumann
1995 – Hans J. Pung, First Captain USMA
1994 – Howard H. Hoege, First Captain USMA
1993 – Shawn Lance Daniel, First Captain USMA
1992 – Omar J. Jones IV, First Captain USMA
1991 – Douglas P. McCormick, First Captain USMA
1990 – Kristin M. Baker, First Captain USMA, first female Knox Trophy recipient, first female Brigade Commander 
1989 – Mark M. Jennings, First Captain USMA
1988 – Gregory H. Louks, First Captain USMA
1987 – John Kai Tien, Jr., First Captain USMA
1986 – Timothy Alan Knight, First Captain USMA
1985 – Brian Lawrence Dosa, First Captain USMA
1984 – William Edward Rapp, First Captain USMA
1983 – Lawrence John Kinde, First Captain USMA
1982 – John William Nicholson, Jr., First Captain USMA
1981 – Stanley Raymond March, First Captain USMA
1980 – Vincent Keith Brooks, First Captain USMA
1979 – John Joseph Cook III, First Captain USMA
1978 – James Allen Hoffman II, First Captain USMA
1977 – Kenneth Franklin Miller, First Captain USMA
1976 – Richard Morales, Jr., First Captain USMA
1975 – James Kevin Abcouwer, First Captain USMA
1974 – Jack Edward Pattison, First Captain USMA
1973 – Joseph Phillips Tallman, First Captain USMA
1972 – Robert Lewis Van Antwerp, Jr., First Captain USMA
1971 – Thomas Alan Pyrz, First Captain USMA
1970 – John Thomas Connors, First Captain USMA
1969 – Robert Henry Baldwin, Jr., First Captain USMA
1968 – John Lathrop Throckmorton, Jr., First Captain USMA
1967 – Jack Bruce Wood, First Captain USMA
1966 – Norman Elliott Fretwell, First Captain USMA
1965 – Carl Robert Arvin, First Captain USMA
1964 – Richard Allen Chilcoat, First Captain USMA
1963 – Richard Everett Eckert, First Captain USMA
1962 – James Raiford Ellis, First Captain USMA, fellow graduate James Kimsey
1961 – Harold Michael Hannon, First Captain USMA
1960 – Charles Paddoc Otstott, First Captain USMA
1959 – Peter Miller Dawkins, First Captain USMA, Heisman Trophy winner, Brigadier General, CEO Primerica, Vice Chair CitiGroup Private Bank, Royal Oak, MI
1958 – Robert Francis Durkin, First Captain USMA, Major General, Director Defense Mapping Agency, Washington DC. Youngstown, OH
1957 – William Thomas Huckabee III, First Captain USMA
1956 – Robert Gordon Farris, First Captain USMA, fellow graduate H. Norman Schwarzkopf
1955 – Lee Donne Olvey, First Captain USMA
1954 – John Chapman Bard, First Captain USMA
1953 – Robert Erwin Barton, First Captain USMA
1952 – Gordon David Carpenter, First Captain USMA
1951 – William Joseph Ryan, First Captain USMA, fellow graduate Edwin E. "Buzz" Aldrin
1950 – John Michael Murphy, First Captain USMA, fellow graduate Frank Borman
1949 – Harry Agustus Griffith, First Captain USMA
1948 – Arnold Web Braswell, First Captain USMA
1947 – William Jackson Schuder, First Captain USMA, fellow graduate Alexander Haig
1946 – Amos Azariah Jordan, Jr., First Captain USMA
1945 – Robert Evans Woods, First Captain USMA
1944 – John Holloway Cushman, First Captain USMA
1943 – Jun - Bernard William Rogers, First Captain USMA
1943 – Jan - James Edward Kelleher, First Captain USMA
1942 – Carl Columbus Hinkle, Jr., First Captain USMA
1941 – John Norton, First Captain USMA
1940 – John Finzer Presnell, Jr., First Captain USMA
1939 – James Lewis Cantrell, First Captain USMA
1938 – Harold Killian Kelley, First Captain USMA
1937 – Stanley Lowell Smith, First Captain USMA 
1936 – William Childs Westmoreland, First Captain USMA, WWII and Vietnam service, Time Magazines Man of Year 1965, Saxon, SC
1935 – Herbert Caran Gee, First Captain USMA
1934 – John de P.Townsend Hills, First Captain USMA
1933 – Kenneth E. Fields, First Captain USMA
1932 – John Paul McConnell, First Captain USMA, four-star General, US Air Force Chief of Staff, Booneville, AK
1931 – John Knight Waters, First Captain USMA, four star General, Commandant USMA 1946, son-in-law of GEN George Patton
1930 – Ralph Powell Swofford, Jr., First Captain USMA
1929 – Bruce Douglas Rindlaub, First Captain USMA
1928 – James Elbert Briggs, First Captain USMA, Rochester, NY
1927 – Charles Edward Martin, First Captain USMA
1926 – Raymond Coleman Maude, First Captain USMA
1925 – Charles Eskridge Saltzman, First Captain USMA
1924 – Robert Vernon Lee, First Captain USMA, SC
1923 – Hugh Wagner Downing
1922 – Charles Joseph Barrett, First Captain USMA
1921 – George Hamden Olmsted, First Captain USMA
1920 – Howard Louis Peckham, First Captain USMA
1919 – Hugh Ambrose Murrill
1918 – John Thornton Knight, Jr., First Captain USMA
1917 – Robert Marks Bathurst
1916 – Raymond George Moses, First Captain USMA
1915 – Roscoe Barnett Woodruff, First Captain USMA (also the class of Dwight David Eisenhower) 59 of the 164 graduates rose to become general officers
1914 – James Bell Cress, First Captain USMA
1913 – David Edward Cain, First Captain USMA, MO
1912 – William Dean, First Captain USMA
1911 – Benjamin Curtis Lockwook, Jr., First Captain USMA, Columbus Barracks, OH

See also 
 General Henry Knox, Secretary of War
 Sons of the American Revolution
 Daughters of the American Revolution
 Children of the American Revolution
 Society of the Cincinnati

References

External links 
 Knox Trophy article in Mr. Local History Project which led to this entry West Point's Oldest Military Award - The Knox Trophy
 USMA First Captains list
 United States Military Academy, West Point
 General Society Sons of the Revolution
 Fraunces Tavern
 Fraunces Tavern Museum
 Massachusetts Society
 New Jersey Society
 New York Society
 North Carolina Society (Gen. Henry Knox Chapter, Knoxville, TN)
 The Daughters of the Cincinnati
 Veteran Corps of Artillery of the State of New York
 Order of Washington
 The Order of the Founders and Patriots of America
 National Society Daughters of the Founders and Patriots of America
 Descendants of the Signers of the Declaration of Independence
 Hereditary Order of the Descendants of the Loyalists & Patriots of the American Revolution

Military awards and decorations of the United States